Eom or EOM may refer to:

People
 Eom (Korean surname)

Science and technology 
 Electro-optic modulator
 End of message
 Enterprise output management
 Equations of motion 
 Ensemble optimization method; see Biological small-angle scattering

Other uses
 Employee of the month (program)
 Encyclopedia of Mathematics
 Encyclopedia of Mormonism
 English-only movement, a political movement in the United States
 Estatuto Orgânico de Macau, an organic statute of Portuguese Macau
 End Of Month